Fırat Yılmaz Çakıroğlu (1 January 1991 – 20 February 2015) was a 24-year-old Turkish nationalist student from Akşehir, Konya. He was murdered after an argument he had with left-wing (according to some reports supporters of the Kurdistan Workers' Party (PKK)) students in Ege University on 20 February 2015. Another student in Ege University, Nurullah Semo was convicted of his murder.

Incident 
Çakıroğlu was the leader of the youth branch of the Nationalist Movement Party (MHP) at the Ege University. On 20 February 2015, an argument between right-wing and left-wing students started in Ege University. The argument quickly turned into a fight and eight people from both sides were injured in the incident, three of them needing hospitalisation, including Çakıroğlu. After two hours he died at the hospital of his wounds. Oktay Vural, a parliamentarian of the MHP blamed members of the PKK for the murder.

Trials 
After a 880 day long trial, Nurullah Semo was sentenced to 15 years of imprisonment for "membership in a terrorist organization" and life imprisonment for homicide.

Legacy 
After his death, two fitness centers in Tarsus and Menderes, two parks in Nazilli and Aliağa and an intersection in Manisa were named after him. There is also a memorial forest named for Çakıroğlu in Etimesgut.

See also 
 Murder of Ertuğrul Dursun Önkuzu

References 

1991 births
2015 deaths
Political violence in Turkey
2015 murders in Turkey
2015 crimes in Turkey
February 2015 crimes in Europe
Murder in İzmir
Deaths by person in Asia
Deaths by stabbing in Turkey
Murdered students
2010s in İzmir